Depot (  or  ) may refer to:

Places
 Depot, Poland, a village
 Depot Island, Kemp Land, Antarctica
 Depot Island, Victoria Land, Antarctica
 Depot Island Formation, Greenland

Brands and enterprises
 Maxwell Street Depot, a restaurant in Chicago, United States
 Office Depot, an American office supply chain
 The Home Depot, an American home improvement retail chain

Computing and technology
 Depot, an application in the Radio Service Software
 Depot, the format for Hewlett-Packard's Software Distributor

Military
 Depot, or logistics center
 Depot, or Main Operating Base, an overseas base for the US military
 Regimental depot, the headquarters and training grounds of a regiment
 Supply depot

Transport

 Depot, a transport hub for freight
 Train depot or train shed, a place where train engines and cars are sheltered and maintained when not it use
 Bus depot or bus garage, a place where buses are sheltered and maintained when not in use
 Bus station, whose name can include the word depot, because a bus depot or garage can be, or previously was, a bus stop or terminal
 Castaway depot, contains stores and survival gear for victims of shipwrecks
 Motive power depot, where trains, locomotives, or trams are sheltered and maintained when not in use
Train station, whose name can include the word depot, because the same place was previously, or still is, being used as a train shelter, and naturally became a railway station as well
 Propellant depot, which supplies fuel to spacecraft

Other uses
 Depot injection, in pharma, a long-term drug delivery by an injection formation (typically 2 weeks - 6 months)
 RCMP Academy, Depot Division, in Saskatchewan, Canada

See also
 Depot Historic District (disambiguation)
 The Depot (disambiguation)